The 2014 FIBA Europe Under-20 Championship was the 17th edition of the FIBA Europe Under-20 Championship. The competition was played in Crete, Greece, from 8 to 20 July 2014. The winners were Turkey. To win the title they beat Spain with a score of 65–57. It was their first ever title win. The runners-up were Spain and third place were Serbia. Defending champions from 2013, Italy, came in at tenth place, their worst result since 2010.

Participating teams
 
 
 

  (Runners-up, 2013 FIBA Europe U20 DivB (Romania))

  (3rd place, 2013 FIBA Europe U20 DivB (Romania))
 

  (Winners, 2013 FIBA Europe U20 DivB (Romania))

Venues

First round
The first-round groups draw took place on 1 December 2013 in Freising, Germany. In this round, the twenty teams were allocated in four groups of five teams each. The top three teams advanced to the Second Round. The last two teams of each group played in the Classification Games.

Group A

Group B

Group C

Group D

Second round

Group E

Group F

Classification groups for 13th – 20th places

Group G

|}

Group H

|}

Classification playoffs for 9th – 20th place

Classification games for 17th – 20th place

Classification games for 13th – 16th place

Classification games for 9th – 12th place

Championship playoffs

Quarterfinals

5th – 8th place playoffs

Semifinals

Final classification games

Match for 19th place

Match for 17th place

Match for 15th place

Match for 13th place

Match for 11th place

Match for 9th place

Match for 7th place

Match for 5th place

Bronze medal match

Final

Final standings

Awards

All-Tournament Team
  Cedi Osman
  Nikola Janković 
  Willy Hernangómez 
  Sasha Vezenkov 
  Matic Rebec

References

FIBA U20 European Championship
2014–15 in European basketball
2014–15 in Greek basketball
International youth basketball competitions hosted by Greece
Sport in Crete